Arthur Künig is an Italian luger who competed in the 1990s. A natural track luger, he won the bronze medal in the men's doubles event at the 1996 FIL World Luge Natural Track Championships in Oberperfuss, Austria.

Künig also won two consecutive silver medals in the men's doubles event at the FIL European Luge Natural Track Championships (1995, 1997).

References
 Natural track European Championships results 1970–2006.
 Natural track World Championships results: 1979–2007

Italian lugers
Italian male lugers
Living people
Year of birth missing (living people)
Sportspeople from Südtirol